Achondrostoma arcasii, termed the bermejuela, is a species of freshwater fish in the family Cyprinidae. It is found in the Douro River in northern Portugal and in rivers draining to both the Atlantic Ocean and the Mediterranean, including the Ebro River, in northern Spain where it is threatened by loss of habitat caused by the building of canals and the construction of dams, as well as by introduced predators and water pollution.

References
 

Achondrostoma
Endemic fish of the Iberian Peninsula
Fish described in 1866